Sweden, formally the Kingdom of Sweden, is a Nordic country located on the Scandinavian Peninsula in Northern Europe. It borders Norway to the west and north, Finland to the east, and is connected to Denmark in the southwest by a bridgetunnel across the Öresund. At , Sweden is the largest Nordic country, the third-largest country in the European Union, and the fifth-largest country in Europe. The capital and largest city is Stockholm.

Nature in Sweden is dominated by forests and many lakes, including some of the largest in Europe. Many long rivers run from the Scandes range through the landscape, primarily emptying into the northern tributaries of the Baltic Sea. It has an extensive coastline and most of the population lives near a major body of water. With the country ranging from 55°N to 69°N, the climate of Sweden is diverse due to the length of the country. The usual conditions are mild for the latitudes with a maritime south, continental centre and subarctic north. Snow cover is variable in the densely populated south, but reliable in higher latitudes. Furthermore, the rain shadow of the Scandes results in quite dry winters and sunny summers in much of the country.

Germanic peoples have inhabited Sweden since prehistoric times, emerging into history as the Geats and Swedes and constituting the sea peoples known as the Norsemen. An independent Swedish state emerged during the early 12th century. After the Black Death in the middle of the 14th century killed about a third of the Scandinavian population, the dominance of the Hanseatic League in Northern Europe threatened Scandinavia economically and politically. This led to the forming of the Scandinavian Kalmar Union in 1397, which Sweden left in 1523. When Sweden became involved in the Thirty Years' War on the Protestant side, an expansion of its territories began, forming the Swedish Empire, which remained one of the great powers of Europe until the early 18th century.

Swedish territories outside the Scandinavian Peninsula were gradually lost during the 18th and 19th centuries, ending with the annexation of present-day Finland by Russia in 1809. The last war in which Sweden was directly involved was in 1814 when Norway was militarily forced into a personal union, which peacefully dissolved in 1905. In 2014, Sweden celebrated 200 years of peace, a longer span of peacetime than even Switzerland. Sweden maintained an official policy of neutrality during wartime and non-participation in military alliances during peacetime, although Sweden secretly relied on U.S. nuclear submarines during the Cold War. Sweden has since 2008 joined EU battlegroups, provided intelligence to NATO and since 2009 openly moved towards cooperation with NATO.

Sweden is a highly developed country ranked seventh in the Human Development Index, it is a constitutional monarchy and a parliamentary democracy, with legislative power vested in the 349-member unicameral . It is a unitary state, currently divided into 21 counties and 290 municipalities. Sweden maintains a Nordic social welfare system that provides universal health care and tertiary education for its citizens. It has the world's 12th highest GDP per capita and ranks very highly in quality of life, health, education, protection of civil liberties, economic competitiveness, income equality, gender equality and prosperity. Sweden joined the European Union on 1 January 1995 but rejected Eurozone membership following a referendum. It is also a member of the United Nations, the Nordic Council, the Council of Europe, the World Trade Organization and the Organisation for Economic Co-operation and Development (OECD).

Etymology 

The name for Sweden is generally agreed to derive from the Proto-Indo-European root *s(w)e, meaning "one's own", referring to one's own tribe from the tribal period.

The contemporary English variation was derived in the 17th-century from Middle Dutch and Middle Low German.

History

Prehistory

Sweden's prehistory begins in the Allerød oscillation, a warm period around 12,000 BC, with Late Palaeolithic reindeer-hunting camps of the Bromme culture at the edge of the ice in what is now the country's southernmost province, Scania. This period was characterised by small clans of hunter-gatherers who relied on flint technology.

Sweden and its people were first described by Publius Cornelius Tacitus in his written work Germania (98 AD). In Germania 44 and 45 he mentions the Swedes (Suiones) as a powerful tribe (distinguished not merely for their arms and men, but for their powerful fleets) with ships that had a prow at each end (longships). Which kings ruled these Suiones is unknown, but Norse mythology presents a long line of legendary and semi-legendary kings going back to the last centuries BC. As for literacy in Sweden itself, the runic script was in use among the south Scandinavian elite by at least the second century AD, but all that has come down to the present from the Roman Period is curt inscriptions on artefacts, mainly of male names, demonstrating that the people of south Scandinavia spoke Proto-Norse at the time, a language ancestral to Swedish and other North Germanic languages.

He later mentions other Scandinavian tribes as being of a same stature.

Vikings

The Swedish Viking Age lasted roughly from the eighth century to the 11th century. It is believed that Swedish Vikings and Gutar mainly travelled east and south, going to Finland, Estonia, the Baltic countries, Russia, Belarus, Ukraine, the Black Sea and even as far as Baghdad. Their routes passed through the Dnieper south to Constantinople, on which they carried out numerous raids. The Byzantine Emperor Theophilos noticed their great skills in war, and invited them to serve as his personal bodyguard, known as the Varangian Guard. The Swedish Vikings, called Rus are believed to be the founding fathers of Kievan Rus'. The Arab traveller Ibn Fadlan described these Vikings saying:

The actions of these Swedish Vikings are commemorated on many runestones in Sweden, such as the Greece runestones and the Varangian runestones. There was also considerable participation in expeditions westwards, which are commemorated on stones such as the England runestones. The last major Swedish Viking expedition appears to have been the ill-fated expedition of Ingvar the Far-Travelled to Serkland, the region south-east of the Caspian Sea. Its members are commemorated on the Ingvar runestones, none of which mentions any survivor. What happened to the crew is unknown, but it is believed that they died of sickness.

Kingdom of Sweden
It is not known when and how the kingdom of Sweden was born, but the list of Swedish monarchs is drawn from the first kings known to have ruled both Svealand (Sweden) and Götaland (Gothia) as one province, beginning with Eric the Victorious. Sweden and Gothia were two separate nations long before that and since antiquity. It is not known how long they existed: the epic poem Beowulf describes semi-legendary Swedish-Geatish wars in the sixth century. Götaland in this sense mainly includes the provinces of Östergötland (East Gothia) and Västergötland (West Gothia). The island of Gotland was disputed by other than Swedes, at this time (Danish, Hanseatic, and Gotland-domestic). Småland was at that time of little interest to anyone due to the deep pine forests, and only the city of Kalmar with its castle was of importance. The south-west parts of the Scandinavian peninsula consisted of three Danish provinces (Scania, Blekinge and Halland). North of Halland, Denmark had a direct border to Norway and its province Bohuslän. But there were Swedish settlements along the southern coastline of Norrland.

During the early stages of the Scandinavian Viking Age, Ystad in the Danish province Scania and Paviken on Gotland were flourishing centres of trade, but they were not parts of the early Swedish Kingdom. Remains of what is believed to have been a large market dating from 600 to 700 CE have been found in Ystad. In Paviken, an important centre of trade in the Baltic region during the ninth and tenth century, remains have been found of a large Viking Age harbour with shipbuilding yards and handicraft industries. Between 800 and 1000, trade brought an abundance of silver to Gotland, and according to some scholars, the Gotlanders of this era hoarded more silver than the rest of the population of Scandinavia combined.

Saint Ansgar is usually credited with introducing Christianity to Sweden in 829, but the new religion did not begin to fully replace paganism until the 12th century. During the 11th century, Christianity became the prevalent religion, and from 1050 Sweden is counted as a Christian nation. The period between 1100 and 1400 was characterised by internal power struggles and competition among the Nordic kingdoms. In the years 1150–1293 according to the legend of Eric IX and the Eric Chronicles Swedish kings made a first, second and third crusade to pagan Finland against Finns, Tavastians, and Karelians and started conflicts with the Rus' who no longer had any connection with Sweden. The Swedish colonisation of the coastal areas of Finland also started during the 12th and 13th century. In the 14th century, the colonisation began to be more organised, and by the end of the century, several of the coastal areas of Finland were inhabited mostly by Swedes.

Except for the provinces of Scania, Blekinge and Halland in the south-west of the Scandinavian peninsula, which were parts of the Kingdom of Denmark during this time, feudalism never developed in Sweden as it did in the rest of Europe. As a result, the peasantry remained largely a class of free farmers throughout most of Swedish history. Slavery (also called thralldom) was not common in Sweden, and what slavery there was tended to be driven out of existence by the spread of Christianity, by the difficulty of obtaining slaves from lands east of the Baltic Sea, and by the development of cities before the 16th century. Indeed, both slavery and serfdom were abolished altogether by a decree of King Magnus IV in 1335. Former slaves tended to be absorbed into the peasantry, and some became labourers in the towns. Still, Sweden remained a poor and economically backward country in which barter was the primary means of exchange. For instance, the farmers of the province of Dalsland would transport their butter to the mining districts of Sweden and exchange it there for iron, which they would then take to the coast and trade for fish, which they consumed, while the iron would be shipped abroad.

In the middle of the 14th century, Sweden was struck by the Black Death. The population of Sweden and most of Europe was decimated. The population (at same territory) did not reach the numbers of the year 1348 again until the beginning of the 19th century. One third of the population died during the period of 1349–1351. During this period, the Swedish cities began to acquire greater rights and were strongly influenced by German merchants of the Hanseatic League, active especially at Visby. In 1319, Sweden and Norway were united under King Magnus Eriksson, and in 1397 Queen Margaret I of Denmark affected the personal union of Sweden, Norway, and Denmark through the Kalmar Union. However, Margaret's successors, whose rule was also centred in Denmark, were unable to control the Swedish nobility.

Many times the Swedish crown was inherited by child kings over the course of the kingdom's existence; consequently, real power was held for long periods by regents (notably those of the Sture family) chosen by the Swedish parliament. King Christian II of Denmark, who asserted his claim to Sweden by force of arms, ordered a massacre of Swedish nobles in Stockholm in 1520. This came to be known as the "Stockholm blood bath" and stirred the Swedish nobility to new resistance and, on 6 June (now Sweden's national holiday) in 1523, they made Gustav Vasa their king. This is sometimes considered as the foundation of modern Sweden. Shortly afterwards the new king rejected Catholicism and led Sweden into the Protestant Reformation.

The Hanseatic League had been officially formed at Lübeck on the Baltic coast of Northern Germany in 1356. The League sought civil and commercial privileges from the princes and royalty of the countries and cities along the coasts of the Baltic Sea. In exchange, they offered a certain amount of protection to the joining cities. Having their own navy, the Hansa were able to sweep the Baltic Sea free of pirates. The privileges obtained by the Hansa included assurances that only Hansa citizens would be allowed to trade from the ports where they were located. They sought agreement to be free of all customs and taxes. With these concessions, Lübeck merchants flocked to Stockholm, where they soon came to dominate the city's economic life and made the port city of Stockholm into the leading commercial and industrial city of Sweden. Under the Hanseatic trade, two-thirds of Stockholm's imports consisted of textiles, while the remaining third was salt. The main exports from Sweden were iron and copper.

However, the Swedes began to resent the monopoly trading position of the Hansa (mostly consisting of German citizens), and to resent the income they felt they lost to the Hansa. Consequently, when Gustav Vasa or Gustav I broke the monopoly power of the Hanseatic League he was regarded as a hero by the Swedish people. History now views Gustav I as the father of the modern Swedish nation. The foundations laid by Gustav would take time to develop. Furthermore, when Sweden did develop, freed itself from the Hanseatic League, and entered its golden era, the fact that the peasantry had traditionally been free meant that more of the economic benefits flowed back to them rather than going to a feudal landowning class.

The end of the 16th century was marked by a final phase of rivalry between the remaining Catholics and the new Protestant communities. In 1592, Gustav Vasa's Catholic grandson and king of Poland, Sigismund, ascended the Swedish throne. He pursued to strengthen Rome's influence by initiating Counter-Reformation and created a dual monarchy, which temporarily became known as the Polish-Swedish Union. His despotic rule, strongly characterised by intolerance towards the Protestants, sparked a civil war that plunged Sweden into poverty. In opposition, Sigismund's uncle and successor, Charles Vasa, summoned the Uppsala Synod in 1593 which officially confirmed the modern Church of Sweden as Lutheran. Following his deposition in 1599, Sigismund attempted to reclaim the throne at every expense and hostilities between Poland and Sweden continued for the next one hundred years.

Swedish Empire

During the 17th century, Sweden emerged as a European great power. Before the emergence of the Swedish Empire, Sweden was a poor and sparsely populated country on the fringe of European civilisation, with no significant power or reputation. Sweden rose to prominence on a continental scale during the reign of king Gustavus Adolphus, seizing territories from Russia and the Polish–Lithuanian Commonwealth in multiple conflicts, including the Thirty Years' War.

During the Thirty Years' War, Sweden conquered approximately half of the Holy Roman states and defeated the Imperial army at the Battle of Breitenfeld in 1631. Gustavus Adolphus planned to become the new Holy Roman Emperor, ruling over a united Scandinavia and the Holy Roman states, but he was killed at the Battle of Lützen in 1632. After the Battle of Nördlingen in 1634, Sweden's only significant military defeat of the war, pro-Swedish sentiment among the German states faded. These German provinces broke away from Swedish power one by one, leaving Sweden with only a few northern German territories: Swedish Pomerania, Bremen-Verden and Wismar. From 1643 to 1645, during the last years of the war, Sweden and Denmark-Norway fought the Torstenson War. The result of that conflict and the conclusion of the Thirty Years' War helped establish postwar Sweden as a major force in Europe.

In the middle of the 17th century, Sweden was the third-largest country in Europe by land area, surpassed by only Russia and Spain. Sweden reached its largest territorial extent under the rule of Charles X after the treaty of Roskilde in 1658, following Charles X's risky but successful crossing of the Danish Belts. The foundation of Sweden's success during this period is credited to Gustav I's major changes to the Swedish economy in the 16th century, and his introduction of Protestantism. In the 17th century, Sweden was engaged in many wars, for example with Poland–Lithuania, with both sides competing for territories of today's Baltic states, with Sweden suffering a notable defeat at the Battle of Kircholm. One-third of the Finnish population died in the devastating Great Famine of 1695–1697 that struck the country. Famine also hit Sweden, killing roughly 10% of Sweden's population.

The Swedes conducted a series of invasions into the Polish–Lithuanian Commonwealth, known as the Deluge. After more than half a century of almost constant warfare, the Swedish economy had deteriorated. It became the lifetime task of Charles X's son, Charles XI, to rebuild the economy and refit the army. His legacy to his son, the coming ruler of Sweden, Charles XII, was one of the finest arsenals in the world, a large standing army and a great fleet. Russia, the most serious threat to Sweden at this time, had a larger army but lagged far behind in both equipment and training.

After the Battle of Narva in 1700, one of the first battles of the Great Northern War, the Russian army was so severely devastated that Sweden had an open chance to invade Russia. However, Charles XII did not pursue the Russian army, instead turning against Poland and defeating the Polish king, Augustus II the Strong, and his Saxon allies at the Battle of Kliszów in 1702. This gave Russia time to rebuild and modernise its army.

After the success of invading Poland, Charles XII decided to make an attempt at invading Russia, but this ended in a decisive Russian victory at the Battle of Poltava in 1709. After a long march exposed to Cossack raids, the Russian Tsar Peter the Great's scorched-earth techniques and the extremely cold winter of 1709, the Swedes stood weakened with a shattered morale and were enormously outnumbered against the Russian army at Poltava. The defeat meant the beginning of the end for the Swedish Empire. In addition, the plague raging in East Central Europe devastated the Swedish dominions and reached Central Sweden in 1710. Returning to Sweden in 1715, Charles XII launched two campaigns against Norway on 1716 and 1718, respectively. During the second attempt, he was shot to death during the siege of Fredriksten fortress. The Swedes were not militarily defeated at Fredriksten, but the whole structure and organisation of the campaign fell apart with the king's death, and the army withdrew.

Forced to cede large areas of land in the Treaty of Nystad in 1721, Sweden also lost its place as an empire and as the dominant state on the Baltic Sea. With Sweden's lost influence, Russia emerged as an empire and became one of Europe's dominant nations. As the war finally ended in 1721, Sweden had lost an estimated 200,000 men, 150,000 of those from the area of present-day Sweden and 50,000 from the Finnish part of Sweden.

In the 18th century, Sweden did not have enough resources to maintain its territories outside Scandinavia, and most of them were lost, culminating with the loss in 1809 of eastern Sweden to Russia, which became the highly autonomous Grand Principality of Finland in Imperial Russia.

In interest of re-establishing Swedish dominance in the Baltic Sea, Sweden allied itself against its traditional ally and benefactor, France, in the Napoleonic Wars. However, in 1810, a French Marshal, Jean-Baptiste Bernadotte, was chosen as heir presumptive to the decrepit Charles XIII; in 1818, he established the House of Bernadotte, taking the regnal name of Charles XIV. Sweden's role in the Battle of Leipzig gave it the authority to force Denmark–Norway, an ally of France, to cede Norway to the King of Sweden on 14 January 1814 in exchange for the northern German provinces, at the Treaty of Kiel. The Norwegian attempts to keep their status as a sovereign state were rejected by the Swedish king, Charles XIII. He launched a military campaign against Norway on 27 July 1814, ending in the Convention of Moss, which forced Norway into a personal union with Sweden under the Swedish crown, which lasted until 1905. The 1814 campaign was the last time Sweden was at war.

Modern history

The Swedish East India Company, began in 1731. The obvious choice of home port was Gothenburg at Sweden's west coast, the mouth of Göta älv river is very wide and has the county's largest and best harbour for high-seas journeys. The trade continued into the 19th century, and caused the little town to become Sweden's second city.
There was a significant population increase during the 18th and 19th centuries, which the writer Esaias Tegnér in 1833 attributed to "the peace, the smallpox vaccine, and the potatoes". Between 1750 and 1850, the population in Sweden doubled. According to some scholars, mass emigration to America became the only way to prevent famine and rebellion; over 1% of the population emigrated annually during the 1880s. Nevertheless, Sweden remained poor, retaining a nearly entirely agricultural economy even as Denmark and Western European countries began to industrialise.

Many looked towards America for a better life during this time. It is thought that between 1850 and 1910 more than one million Swedes moved to the United States. In the early 20th century, more Swedes lived in Chicago than in Gothenburg (Sweden's second largest city). Most Swedish immigrants moved to the midwestern United States, with a large population in Minnesota, with a few others moving to other parts of the United States and Canada.

Despite the slow rate of industrialisation into the 19th century, many important changes were taking place in the agrarian economy due to constant innovations and a rapid population growth. These innovations included government-sponsored programmes of enclosure, aggressive exploitation of agricultural lands, and the introduction of new crops such as the potato. Because the Swedish peasantry had never been enserfed as elsewhere in Europe,  the Swedish farming culture began to take on a critical role in Swedish politics, which has continued through modern times with modern Agrarian party (now called the Centre Party). Between 1870 and 1914, Sweden began developing the industrialised economy that exists today.

Strong grassroots movements sprang up in Sweden during the latter half of the 19th century (trade unions, temperance groups, and independent religious groups), creating a strong foundation of democratic principles. In 1889 The Swedish Social Democratic Party was founded. These movements precipitated Sweden's migration into a modern parliamentary democracy, achieved by the time of World War I. As the Industrial Revolution progressed during the 20th century, people gradually moved into cities to work in factories and became involved in socialist unions. A communist revolution was avoided in 1917, following the re-introduction of parliamentarism, and the country was democratised.

World War I and World War II

Sweden was officially neutral during World War I. However, under pressure from the German Empire, they did take steps which were detrimental to the Allied powers. Most notably, mining the Øresund channel, thus closing it to Allied shipping, and allowing the Germans to use Swedish facilities and the Swedish cipher to transmit secret messages to their overseas embassies. Sweden also allowed volunteers to fight for the White Guards alongside the Germans against the Red Guards and Russians in the Finnish Civil War, and briefly occupied Åland in cooperation with the German Empire.

As in the First World War, Sweden remained officially neutral during World War II, although its neutrality during World War II has been disputed. Sweden was under German influence for much of the war, as ties to the rest of the world were cut off through blockades. The Swedish government felt that it was in no position to openly contest Germany, and therefore made some concessions. Sweden also supplied steel and machined parts to Germany throughout the war. The Swedish government unofficially supported Finland in the Winter War and the Continuation War by allowing volunteers and materiel to be shipped to Finland. However, Sweden supported Norwegian resistance against Germany, and in 1943 helped rescue Danish Jews from deportation to Nazi concentration camps.

During the last year of the war, Sweden began to play a role in humanitarian efforts, and many refugees, among them several thousand Jews from Nazi-occupied Europe, were rescued thanks to the Swedish rescue missions to internment camps and partly because Sweden served as a haven for refugees, primarily from the Nordic countries and the Baltic states. The Swedish diplomat Raoul Wallenberg and his colleagues ensured the safety of tens of thousands of Hungarian Jews. Nevertheless, both Swedes and others have argued that Sweden could have done more to oppose the Nazis' war efforts, even if it meant increasing the risk of occupation.

Post-war era

Sweden was officially a neutral country and remained outside NATO and Warsaw Pact membership during the Cold War, but privately Sweden's leadership had strong ties with the United States and other western governments. Following the war, Sweden took advantage of an intact industrial base, social stability and its natural resources to expand its industry to supply the rebuilding of Europe. Sweden received aid under the Marshall Plan and participated in the OECD. During most of the post-war era, the country was governed by the Swedish Social Democratic Party largely in co-operation with trade unions and industry. The government actively pursued an internationally competitive manufacturing sector of primarily large corporations.

Sweden was one of the founding states of the European Free Trade Area (EFTA). During the 1960s the EFTA countries were often referred to as the Outer Seven, as opposed to the Inner Six of the then-European Economic Community (EEC).

Sweden, like many industrialised countries, entered a period of economic decline and upheaval following the oil embargoes of 1973–74 and 1978–79. In the 1980s several key Swedish industries were significantly restructured. Shipbuilding was discontinued, wood pulp was integrated into modernised paper production, the steel industry was concentrated and specialised, and mechanical engineering was robotised.

Between 1970 and 1990, the overall tax burden rose by over 10%, and the growth was low compared with other countries in Western Europe. Eventually, the government began to spend over half of the country's gross domestic product. Swedish GDP per capita ranking declined during this time.

Recent history

A bursting real estate bubble caused by inadequate controls on lending combined with an international recession and a policy switch from anti-unemployment policies to anti-inflationary policies resulted in a fiscal crisis in the early 1990s. Sweden's GDP declined by around 5%. In 1992, a run on the currency caused the central bank to briefly increase interest rates to 500%.

The response of the government was to cut spending and institute a multitude of reforms to improve Sweden's competitiveness, among them reducing the welfare state and privatising public services and goods. Much of the political establishment promoted EU membership, and a referendum passed with 52.3% in favour of joining the EU on 13 November 1994. Sweden joined the European Union on 1 January 1995. In a 2003 referendum the Swedish electorate voted against the country joining the Euro currency. In 2006 Sweden got its first majority government for decades as the centre-right Alliance defeated the incumbent Social Democrat government. Following the rapid growth of support for the anti-immigration Sweden Democrats, and their entrance to the Riksdag in 2010, the Alliance became a minority cabinet.

Until recently Sweden remained non-aligned militarily, although it participated in some joint military exercises with NATO and some other countries, in addition to extensive cooperation with other European countries in the area of defence technology and defence industry. However, in 2022, in response to the 2022 Russian invasion of Ukraine, Sweden moved to formally join the NATO alliance. The same year, Sweden applied for NATO membership and was formally invited to join the alliance at the NATO Summit in Madrid. The secretary general of NATO Jens Stoltenberg spoke of a fast-track membership process of just a few weeks, however NATO member Turkey has repeatedly hindered Sweden from joining the alliance, demanding Swedish action against the PKK and for Sweden to extradite alleged Kurdish ″terrorists″ to Turkey, the situation straining relations between the two countries. Turkey has maintained links with Russia since its invasion of Ukraine in 2022.

Swedish export weapons were also used by the American military in Iraq. Sweden has a long history of participating in international military operations, including Afghanistan, where Swedish troops are under NATO command, and in EU-sponsored peacekeeping operations in Kosovo, Bosnia and Herzegovina, and Cyprus. Sweden also participated in enforcing a UN mandated no-fly zone over Libya during the Arab Spring. Sweden held the chair of the European Union from 1 July to 31 December 2009.

In recent decades Sweden has become a more culturally diverse nation due to significant immigration; in 2013, it was estimated that 15% of the population was foreign-born, and an additional 5% of the population were born to two immigrant parents. The influx of immigrants has brought new social challenges. Violent incidents have periodically occurred including the 2013 Stockholm riots, which broke out following the police shooting of an elderly Portuguese immigrant. In response to these violent events, the anti-immigration opposition party, the Sweden Democrats, promoted their anti-immigration policies, while the left-wing opposition blamed growing inequality caused by the centre-right government's socioeconomic policies.

In 2014, Stefan Löfven (Social Democrats) won the General Election and became the new Swedish Prime Minister to succeed Fredrik Reinfeldt of the liberal conservative Moderate Party. The Sweden Democrats held the balance of power and voted the government's budget down in the Riksdag, but due to agreements between the government and the Alliance, the government was able to hang onto power. Sweden was heavily affected by the 2015 European migrant crisis, eventually forcing the government to tighten regulations of entry to the country, as Sweden received thousands of asylum seekers and migrants predominantly from Africa and the Middle East per week in autumn, overwhelming existing structures. Some of the asylum restrictions were relaxed again later.

The 2018 general election saw the Red-greens lose seats to the right-wing Sweden Democrats and to the centre-right parties of the former Alliance. Despite holding only 33% of the seats in the Riksdag, the Social Democrats and the Greens managed to form a minority government, led by Prime Minister Stefan Lofven, in January 2019, relying on supply and confidence from the Centre Party, Liberals and the Left Party.

In August 2021, Prime Minister Stefan Lofven announced his resignation and finance minister Magdalena Andersson was elected as the new head of Sweden's ruling Social Democrats in November 2021. On 30 November 2021, Magdalena Andersson became Sweden's first female prime minister. She formed a minority government made up of only her Social Democrats. Her plan for forming a new coalition government with the Green Party was unsuccessful because her budget proposal failed to pass.

The September 2022 general election ended in a narrow win to a bloc of right-wing parties, meaning the resignation of Magdalena Andersson's government. On 18 October 2022, Ulf Kristersson of the Moderate Party became the new Prime Minister of Sweden. Kristersson's Moderates formed a centre-right coalition with the Christian Democrats and the Liberals. The new government will be backed by the biggest right-wing party, Sweden Democrats (SD) led by Jimmie Åkesson, meaning tougher immigration policies as a crucial part of a policy deal with the SD.

Geography

Situated in Northern Europe, Sweden lies west of the Baltic Sea and Gulf of Bothnia, providing a long coastline, and forms the eastern part of the Scandinavian Peninsula. To the west is the Scandinavian mountain chain (Skanderna), a range that separates Sweden from Norway. Finland is located to its north-east. It has maritime borders with Denmark, Germany, Poland, Russia, Lithuania, Latvia and Estonia, and it is also linked to Denmark (south-west) by the Öresund Bridge. Its border with Norway (1,619 km long) is the longest uninterrupted border within Europe.

Sweden lies between latitudes 55° and 70° N, and mostly between longitudes 11° and 25° E (part of Stora Drammen island is just west of 11°).

At , Sweden is the 55th-largest country in the world, the fifth-largest country in Europe, and the largest country in Northern Europe.

While these provinces serve no political or administrative purpose, they play an important role in people's self-identity. The provinces are usually grouped together in three large lands, parts, the northern Norrland, the central Svealand and southern Götaland. The sparsely populated Norrland encompasses almost 60% of the country. Sweden also has the Vindelfjällen Nature Reserve, one of the largest protected areas in Europe, totaling 562,772 ha (approx. 5,628 km).

About 15% of Sweden lies north of the Arctic Circle. Southern Sweden is predominantly agricultural, with increasing forest coverage northward. Around 65% of Sweden's total land area is covered with forests. The highest population density is in the Öresund Region in southern Sweden, along the western coast up to central Bohuslän, and in the valley of lake Mälaren and Stockholm. Gotland and Öland are Sweden's largest islands; Vänern and Vättern are its largest lakes. Vänern is the third largest in Europe, after Lake Ladoga and Lake Onega in Russia. Combined with the third- and fourth-largest lakes Mälaren and Hjälmaren, these lakes take up a significant part of southern Sweden's area. Sweden's extensive waterway availability throughout the south was exploited with the building of the Göta Canal in the 19th century, shortening the potential distance between the Baltic Sea south of Norrköping and Gothenburg by using the lake and river network to facilitate the canal.

Sweden also has plenty of long rivers draining the lakes. The longest river is Klarälven-Göta älv, which originates in Trøndelag in central Norway, running  before it enters the sea at Gothenburg. Dalälven and the Torne are the second and third longest rivers in the country. Torne marks a large part of the Finland border. The vast majority of municipal seats are set either on the sea, a river or a lake and the majority of the country's population live in coastal municipalities.

Climate

Most of Sweden has a temperate climate, despite its northern latitude, with largely four distinct seasons and mild temperatures throughout the year. The winter in the far south is usually weak and is manifested only through some shorter periods with snow and sub-zero temperatures; autumn may well turn into spring there, without a distinct period of winter. The northern parts of the country have a subarctic climate while the central parts have a humid continental climate. The coastal south can be defined as having either a humid continental climate using the 0 °C isotherm, or an oceanic climate using the −3 °C isotherm.

This grows further when comparing areas in the northern interior where the winter difference in the far north is about  throughout the country. The warmest summers usually happen in the Mälaren Valley around Stockholm due to the vast landmass shielding the middle east coast from Atlantic low-pressure systems in July compared to the south and west. The colder temperatures are influenced by the higher elevation in the northern interior. As a result of the mild summers, the arctic region of Norrbotten has some of the northernmost agriculture in the world.

Sweden is much warmer and drier than other places at a similar latitude, and even somewhat farther south, mainly because of the combination of the Gulf Stream and the general west wind drift, caused by the direction of planet Earth's rotation. Sweden has much milder winters than many parts of Russia, Canada, and the northern United States. Because of Sweden's high latitude, the length of daylight varies greatly. North of the Arctic Circle, the sun never sets for part of each summer, and it never rises for part of each winter. In the capital, Stockholm, daylight lasts for more than 18 hours in late June but only around 6 hours in late December. Sweden receives between 1,100 and 1,900 hours of sunshine annually.

Temperatures expected in Sweden are heavily influenced by the large Fennoscandian landmass, as well as continental Europe and western Russia, which allows hot or cool inland air to be easily transported to Sweden. That, in turn, renders most of Sweden's southern areas having warmer summers than almost everywhere in the nearby British Isles, even matching temperatures found along the continental Atlantic coast as far south as in northern Spain. In winter, however, the same high-pressure systems sometimes put the entire country far below freezing temperatures. There is some maritime moderation from the Atlantic which renders the Swedish continental climate less severe than that of nearby Russia.

Apart from the ice-free Atlantic bringing marine air into Sweden tempering winters, the mildness is further explained by prevailing low-pressure systems postponing winter, with the long nights often staying above freezing in the south of the country due to the abundant cloud cover. By the time winter finally breaks through, daylight hours rise quickly, ensuring that daytime temperatures soar quickly in spring. With the greater number of clear nights, frosts remain commonplace quite far south as late as April.

The relative strength of low and high-pressure systems of marine and continental air also define the highly variable summers. Nights normally remain cool, especially in inland areas. Coastal areas can see so-called tropical nights above  occur due to the moderating sea influence during warmer summers. Summers can be cool, especially in the north of the country. Transitional seasons are normally quite extensive and the four-season climate applies to most of Sweden's territory, except in Scania where some years do not record a meteorological winter (see table below) or in the high Lapland mountains where polar microclimates exist.

Despite northerly locations, southern and central Sweden may have almost no snow in some winters. Most of Sweden is located in the rain shadow of the Scandinavian Mountains through Norway and north-west Sweden. The blocking of cool and wet air in summer, as well as the greater landmass, leads to warm and dry summers far north in the country, with quite warm summers at the Bothnia Bay coast at 65 degrees latitude, which is unheard of elsewhere in the world at such northerly coastlines.

It is predicted that as the Barents Sea gets less frozen in the coming winters, becoming thus "Atlantified", additional evaporation will increase future snowfalls in Sweden and much of continental Europe.

Vegetation

Sweden has a considerable south to north distance (stretching between the latitudes N 55:20:13 and N 69:03:36) which causes large climatic difference, especially during the winter. The related matter of the length and strength of the four seasons plays a role in which plants that naturally can grow at various places. Sweden is divided in five major vegetation zones. These are:

 The southern deciduous forest zone
 The southern coniferous forest zone
 The northern coniferous forest zone, or the Taiga
 The alpine-birch zone
 The bare mountain zone

Southern deciduous forest zone, also known as the nemoral region, the southern deciduous forest zone is a part of a larger vegetation zone which also includes Denmark and large parts of Central Europe. It has to a rather large degree become agricultural areas, but larger and smaller forests still exist. The region is characterised by a large wealth of trees and shrubs. The beech are the most dominant tree, but oak can also form smaller forests. elm at one time formed forests, but have been heavily reduced due to Dutch Elm disease. Other important trees and shrubs in this zone include hornbeam, elder, hazel, fly honeysuckle, linden (lime), spindle, yew, alder buckthorn, blackthorn, aspen, European rowan, Swedish whitebeam, juniper, European holly, ivy, dogwood, goat willow, larch, bird cherry, wild cherry, maple, ash, alder along creeks, and in sandy soil birch compete with pine. Spruce is not native but between approximately 1870 and 1980, large areas were planted with it. They tend to grow too quickly due to being outside of their native range and large distances between the tree rings cause poor board quality. Later some spruce trees began to die before reaching optimal height, and many more of the coniferous trees were uprooted during cyclones. During the last 40–50 years large areas of former spruce plantings have been replanted with deciduous forest.

Southern coniferous forest zone, also known as the boreo-nemoral region, the southern coniferous forest zone is delimited by the oak's northern natural limit (limes norrlandicus) and the Spruce's southern natural limit, between the southern deciduous zone and the Taiga farther north. In the southern parts of this zone the coniferous species are found, mainly spruce and pine, mixed with various deciduous trees. Birch grows largely everywhere. The beech's northern boundary crosses this zone. This is however not the case with oak and ash. Although in its natural area, also planted Spruce are common, and such woods are very dense, as the spruces can grow very tight, especially in this vegetation zone's southern areas.

The northern coniferous forest zone or the Taiga begins north of the natural boundary of the oak. Of deciduous species the birch is the only one of significance. Pine and spruce are dominant, but the forests are slowly but surely more sparsely grown the farther towards the north it gets. In the extreme north is it difficult to state the trees forms true forests at all, due to the large distances between the trees.

The alpine-birch zone, in the Scandinavian mountains, depending on both latitude and altitude, is an area where only a smaller kind of birch (Betula pubescens or B.tortuosa) can grow. Where this vegetation zone ends, no trees grow at all: the bare mountain zone.

Sweden had a 2019 Forest Landscape Integrity Index mean score of 5.35/10, ranking it 103rd globally out of 172 countries.

Government and politics

Constitutional framework

The public sector in Sweden is divided into two parts: the legal person known as the State and local authorities: the latter include Regional Councils (renamed from county councils (landsting) in 2020) and local Municipalities. The local authorities, rather than the State, make up the larger part of the public sector in Sweden. Regional Councils and Municipalities are independent of one another, the former merely covers a larger geographical area than the latter. The local authorities have self-rule, as mandated by the Constitution, and their own tax base. Notwithstanding their self-rule, local authorities are nevertheless in practice dependent upon the State, as the parameters of their responsibilities and the extent of their jurisdiction are specified in the Local Government Act passed by the Riksdag.

Sweden is a constitutional monarchy, and King Carl XVI Gustaf is the head of state, but the role of the monarch is limited to ceremonial and representative functions. Under the provisions of the 1974 Instrument of Government, the King lacks any formal political power. The King opens the annual Riksdag session, chairs the Special Council held during a change of Government, holds regular Information Councils with the Prime Minister and the Government, chairs the meetings of the Advisory Council on Foreign Affairs, and receives Letters of Credence of foreign ambassadors to Sweden and signs those of Swedish ambassadors sent abroad. In addition, the King pays State Visits abroad and receives those incoming as host. Apart from strictly official duties, the King and the other members of Royal Family undertake a variety of unofficial and other representative duties within Sweden and abroad.

Legislative power is vested in the unicameral Riksdag with 349 members. General elections are held every four years, on the second Sunday of September. Legislation may be initiated by the Government or by members of the Riksdag. Members are elected on the basis of proportional representation to a four-year term. The internal workings of the Riksdag are, in addition to the Instrument of Government, regulated by the Riksdag Act. The fundamental laws can be altered by the Riksdag alone; only an absolute majority with two separate votes, separated by a general election in between, is required.

The Government operates as a collegial body with collective responsibility and consists of the Prime Minister  appointed and dismissed by the Speaker of the Riksdag (following an actual vote in the Riksdag before an appointment can be made)  and other cabinet ministers, appointed and dismissed at the sole discretion of the Prime Minister. The Government is the supreme executive authority and is responsible for its actions to the Riksdag.

Most of the State administrative authorities report to the Government, including (but not limited to) the Armed Forces, the Enforcement Authority, the National Library, the Swedish police and the Tax Agency. A unique feature of Swedish State administration is that individual cabinet ministers do not bear any individual ministerial responsibility for the performance of the agencies within their portfolio; as the director-generals and other heads of government agencies reports directly to the Government as a whole; and individual ministers are prohibited to interfere; thus the origin of the pejorative in Swedish political parlance term ministerstyre (English: "ministerial rule") in matters that are to be handled by the individual agencies, unless otherwise specifically provided for in law.

The Judiciary is independent from the Riksdag, Government and other State administrative authorities. The role of judicial review of legislation is not practised by the courts; instead, the Council on Legislation gives non-binding opinions on legality. There is no stare decisis in that courts are not bound by precedent, although it is influential.

Political parties and elections

The Swedish Social Democratic Party has played a leading role in Swedish politics since 1917, after the Reformists had confirmed their strength and the left-wing revolutionaries formed their own party. After 1932, most governments have been dominated by the Social Democrats. Only six general elections since World War II—1976, 1979, 1991, 2006, 2010 and 2022—have given the assembled bloc of centre-right parties enough seats in the Riksdag to form a government.

For over 50 years, Sweden had had five parties who continually received enough votes to gain seats in the Riksdag—the Social Democrats, the Moderate Party, the Centre Party, the Liberal People's Party and the Left Party—before the Green Party became the sixth party in the 1988 election. In the 1991 election, while the Greens lost their seats, two new parties gained seats for the first time: the Christian Democrats and New Democracy. The 1994 election saw the return of the Greens and the demise of New Democracy. It was not until elections in 2010 that an eighth party, the Sweden Democrats, gained Riksdag seats. In the elections to the European Parliament, parties who have failed to pass the Riksdag threshold have managed to gain representation at that venue: the June List (2004–2009), the Pirate Party (2009–2014), and Feminist Initiative (2014–2019).

In the 2006 general election the Moderate Party formed the centre-right Alliance for Sweden bloc and won a majority of the Riksdag seats. In the 2010 general election the Alliance contended against a unified left block consisting of the Social Democrats, the Greens and the Left Party. The Alliance won a plurality of 173 seats, but remained two seats short of a 175-seat majority. Nevertheless, neither the Alliance, nor the left block, chose to form a coalition with the Sweden Democrats.

The outcome of the 2014 general election resulted in the attainment of more seats by the three centre-left parties in comparison to the centre-right Alliance for Sweden, with the two blocs receiving 159 and 141 seats respectively. The non-aligned Sweden Democrats more than doubled their support and won the remaining 49 seats. On 3 October 2014, Stefan Löfven formed a minority government consisting of the Social Democrats and the Greens.

In August 2021, Prime Minister Stefan Löfven announced his resignation and finance minister Magdalena Andersson was elected as the new head of Sweden's ruling Social Democrats in November 2021. On 30 November 2021, Magdalena Andersson became Sweden's first female prime minister. She formed a minority government made up of only her Social Democrats. Her plan for forming a new coalition government with the Green Party was unsuccessful the coalition partner left after her budget proposal failed to pass. In the 2022 election, the remnants of the Alliance were able to secure a narrow majority. This was backed up by the surging Sweden Democrats becoming the second largest party. The election saw Andersson resigning from her post, with the Moderate leader Ulf Kristersson the likely replacement. The election saw the right-wing coalition win dozens of small towns always dominated by the left, while suffering major losses in the big cities.

Election turnout in Sweden has always been high by international comparison. Although it declined in recent decades, the latest elections saw an increase in voter turnout (80.11% in 2002, 81.99% in 2006, 84.63% in 2010, 85.81 in 2014) and 87.18% in 2018. Swedish politicians enjoyed a high degree of confidence from the citizens in the 1960s, However, that level of confidence has since declined steadily, and is now at a markedly lower level than in its Scandinavian neighbours.

Administrative divisions

Sweden is a unitary state divided into 21 regions and 290 municipalities. Every region corresponds to a county with a number of municipalities per county. Regions and municipalities are both local government bur have different roles and separate responsibilities. Health care, public transport and certain cultural institutions are administered by regional councils. Preschools, primary and secondary schooling, public water utilities, garbage disposal, elderly care and rescue services are administered by the municipalities. Gotland is a special case of being a region with only one municipality and the functions of region and municipality are performed by the same organisation.

Municipal and region government in Sweden is similar to city commission and cabinet-style council government. Both levels have legislative assemblies (municipal councils and region assemblies of between 31 and 101 members (always an uneven number) that are elected from party-list proportional representation at the general election which are held every four years in conjunction with the national parliamentary elections.

Municipalities are also divided into a total of 2,512 parishes. These have no official political responsibilities but are traditional subdivisions of the Church of Sweden and still have some importance as census districts for census-taking and elections.

The Swedish central government has 21 County Administrative Boards, which are responsible for regional state administration not assigned to other government agencies or local government. Each county administrative board is led by a County Governor appointed for a term of six years. The list of previous officeholders for the counties stretches back, in most cases, to 1634 when the counties were created by Lord High Chancellor Count Axel Oxenstierna. The main responsibility of the County Administrative Board is to co-ordinate the development of the county in line with goals set by the Riksdag and Government.

There are older historical divisions, primarily the twenty-five provinces and three lands, which still retain cultural significance.

Political history

The actual age of the kingdom of Sweden is unknown. In the first case, Svealand was first mentioned as having one single ruler in the year 98 by Tacitus, but it is almost impossible to know for how long it had been this way. However, historians usually start the line of Swedish monarchs from when Svealand and Götaland were ruled under the same king, namely Eric the Victorious (Geat) and his son Olof Skötkonung in the tenth century. These events are often described as the consolidation of Sweden, although substantial areas were conquered and incorporated later.

Earlier kings, for which no reliable historical sources exist, can be read about in mythical kings of Sweden and semi-legendary kings of Sweden. Many of these kings are only mentioned in various saga and blend with Norse mythology.

The title  was last used for Gustaf I of Sweden, after which the title became "King of Sweden, of the Goths and of the Wends" in official documentation. Up until the beginning of the 1920s, all laws in Sweden were introduced with the words, "We, the king of Sweden, of the Goths and Wends". This title was used up until 1973. The present King of Sweden, Carl XVI Gustaf, was the first monarch officially proclaimed "King of Sweden" with no additional peoples mentioned in his title.

The term  was used for the first time in the 1540s, although the first meeting where representatives of different social groups were called to discuss and determine affairs affecting the country as a whole took place as early as 1435, in the town of Arboga. During the Riksdag assemblies of 1527 and 1544, under King Gustav Vasa, representatives of all four estates of the realm (clergy, nobility, townsmen and peasants) were called on to participate for the first time. The monarchy became hereditary in 1544.

Executive power was historically shared between the King and an aristocratic Privy council until 1680, followed by the King's autocratic rule initiated by the commoner estates of the Riksdag. As a reaction to the failed Great Northern War, a parliamentary system was introduced in 1719, followed by three different flavours of constitutional monarchy in 1772, 1789 and 1809, the latter granting several civil liberties. Already during the first of those three periods, the 'Era of Liberty' (1719–72) the Swedish Rikstag had developed into a very active Parliament, and this tradition continued into the nineteenth century, laying the basis for the transition towards modern democracy at the end of that century.

In 1866, Sweden became a constitutional monarchy with a bicameral parliament, with the First Chamber indirectly elected by local governments, and the Second Chamber directly elected in national elections every four years. In 1971 the parliament became unicameral. Legislative power was (symbolically) shared between the King and the Riksdag until 1975. Swedish taxation is controlled by the Riksdag.

Sweden has a history of strong political involvement by ordinary people through its "popular movements", the most notable being trade unions, the independent Christian movement, the temperance movement, the women's movement, and the intellectual property pirate movements. Sweden was the first country in the world to outlaw corporal punishment of children by their parents (parents' right to spank their own children was first removed in 1966, and it was explicitly prohibited by law from July 1979).

Sweden is currently leading the EU in statistics measuring equality in the political system and equality in the education system. The Global Gender Gap Report 2006 ranked Sweden as the number one country in terms of gender equality.

Some Swedish political figures have become known worldwide, among these are: Raoul Wallenberg, Folke Bernadotte, the former Secretary-General of the United Nations Dag Hammarskjöld, the former Prime Minister Olof Palme, the former Prime Minister and later Foreign minister Carl Bildt, the former President of the General Assembly of the United Nations Jan Eliasson, and the former International Atomic Energy Agency Iraq inspector Hans Blix.

Judicial system

The courts are divided into two parallel and separate systems: The general courts for criminal and civil cases, and general administrative courts for cases relating to disputes between private persons and the authorities. Each of these systems has three tiers, where the top tier court of the respective system typically only will hear cases that may become precedent. There are also a number of special courts, which will hear a narrower set of cases, as set down by legislation. While independent in their rulings, some of these courts are operated as divisions within courts of the general or general administrative courts.

The Supreme Court of Sweden is the third and final instance in all civil and criminal cases in Sweden. Before a case can be decided by the Supreme Court, leave to appeal must be obtained, and with few exceptions, leave to appeal can be granted only when the case is of interest as a precedent. The Supreme Court consists of 16 Justices, appointed by the Government, but the court as an institution is independent of the Riksdag, and the Government is not able to interfere with the decisions of the court.

According to a victimisation survey of 1,201 residents in 2005, Sweden has above-average crime rates compared to other EU countries. Sweden has high or above-average levels of assaults, sexual assaults, hate crimes, and consumer fraud. Sweden has low levels of burglary, car theft and drug problems. Bribe seeking is rare.

A mid-November 2013 news report announced that four prisons in Sweden were closed during the year due to a significant drop in the number of inmates. The decrease in the number of Swedish prisoners was considered "out-of-the-ordinary" by the head of Sweden's prison and probation services, with prison numbers in Sweden falling by around 1% a year since 2004. Prisons were closed in the towns of Åby, Håja, Båtshagen, and Kristianstad.

Foreign relations 

Throughout the 20th century, Swedish foreign policy was based on the principle of non-alignment in peacetime and neutrality in wartime. Sweden's government pursued an independent course of nonalignment in times of peace so that neutrality would be possible in the event of war.

Sweden's doctrine of neutrality is often traced back to the 19th century as the country has not been in a state of war since the end of the Swedish campaign against Norway in 1814. During World War II Sweden joined neither the allied nor axis powers. This has sometimes been disputed since in effect Sweden allowed in select cases the Nazi regime to use its railroad system to transport troops and goods, especially iron ore from mines in northern Sweden, which was vital to the German war machine. However, Sweden also indirectly contributed to the defence of Finland in the Winter War, and permitted the training of Norwegian and Danish troops in Sweden after 1943.

During the early Cold War era, Sweden combined its policy of non-alignment and a low profile in international affairs with a security policy based on strong national defence. The function of the Swedish military was to deter attack. At the same time, the country maintained relatively close informal connections with the Western bloc, especially in the realm of intelligence exchange. In 1952, a Swedish DC-3 was shot down over the Baltic Sea by a Soviet MiG-15 jet fighter. Later investigations revealed that the plane was actually gathering information for NATO. Another plane, a Catalina search and rescue plane, was sent out a few days later and shot down by the Soviets as well. Prime Minister Olof Palme made an official visit to Cuba during the 1970s, during which he denounced Fulgencio Batista's government and praised contemporary Cuban and Cambodian revolutionaries in a speech.

Beginning in the late 1960s, Sweden attempted to play a more significant and independent role in international relations. It involved itself significantly in international peace efforts, especially through the United Nations, and in support to the Third World.

On 27 October 1981, a Whiskey-class submarine (U 137) from the Soviet Union ran aground close to the naval base at Karlskrona in the southern part of the country. Research has never clearly established whether the submarine ended up on the shoals through a navigational mistake or if an enemy committed espionage against Swedish military potential. The incident triggered a diplomatic crisis between Sweden and the Soviet Union. Following the 1986 assassination of Olof Palme and with the end of the Cold War, Sweden has adopted a more traditional foreign policy approach. Nevertheless, the country remains active in peacekeeping missions and maintains a considerable foreign aid budget.

Since 1995 Sweden has been a member of the European Union, and as a consequence of a new world security situation the country's foreign policy doctrine has been partly modified, with Sweden playing a more active role in European security co-operation. In 2022, in response to Russia's invasion of Ukraine, Sweden moved to formally join the NATO alliance. The secretary general of NATO Jens Stoltenberg spoke of a fast-track membership process of just a few weeks, however NATO member Turkey has repeatedly hindered Sweden from joining the alliance, demanding Swedish action against the PKK and for Sweden to extradite alleged Kurdish ″terrorists″ to Turkey, the situation straining relations between the two countries. Turkey has maintained links with Russia since its invasion of Ukraine in 2022.

Military 

The law is enforced in Sweden by several government entities. The Swedish police is a Government agency concerned with police matters. The National Task Force is a national SWAT unit within the police force. The Swedish Security Service's responsibilities are counter-espionage, anti-terrorist activities, protection of the constitution and protection of sensitive objects and people.

The  (Swedish Armed Forces) are a government agency reporting to the Swedish Ministry of Defence and responsible for the peacetime operation of the armed forces of Sweden. The primary task of the agency is to train and deploy peacekeeping forces abroad, while maintaining the long-term ability to refocus on the defence of Sweden in the event of war. The armed forces are divided into Army, Air Force and Navy. The head of the armed forces is the Supreme Commander (ÖB), the most senior commissioned officer in the country. Up to 1974, the King was pro forma Commander-in-Chief, but in reality it was clearly understood through the 20th century that the monarch would have no active role as a military leader.

Until the end of the Cold War, nearly all males reaching the age of military service were conscripted. In recent years, the number of conscripted males has shrunk dramatically, while the number of female volunteers has increased slightly. Recruitment has generally shifted towards finding the most motivated recruits, rather than solely focusing on those otherwise most fit for service. By law, all soldiers serving abroad must be volunteers. In 1975, the total number of conscripts was 45,000. By 2003, it was down to 15,000.

On 1 July 2010, Sweden ended routine conscription, switching to an all-volunteer force unless otherwise required for defence readiness. Emphasis was to be placed on only recruiting those later prepared to volunteer for international service. The total forces gathered would consist of about 60,000 personnel. This in comparison with the 1980s, before the fall of the Soviet Union, when Sweden could gather up to 1,000,000 servicemembers.

However, on 11 December 2014, due to tensions in the Baltic area, the Swedish Government reintroduced one part of the Swedish conscription system, refresher training. On 2 March 2017, the government decided to reintroduce the remaining part of the Swedish conscription system, basic military training. The first recruits began their training in 2018. As the law is now gender neutral, both men and women may have to serve. Sweden decided not to sign the UN treaty on the Prohibition of Nuclear Weapons.

Swedish units have taken part in peacekeeping operations in the Democratic Republic of the Congo, Cyprus, Bosnia and Herzegovina, Kosovo, Liberia, Lebanon, Afghanistan and Chad.

Economy

Sweden is the twelfth-richest country in the world in terms of GDP (gross domestic product) per capita and a high standard of living is experienced by its citizens. Sweden is an export-oriented mixed economy. Timber, hydropower and iron ore constitute the resource base of an economy with a heavy emphasis on foreign trade. Sweden's engineering sector accounts for 50% of output and exports, while telecommunications, the automotive industry and the pharmaceutical industries are also of great importance. Sweden is the ninth-largest arms exporter in the world. Agriculture accounts for 2% of GDP and employment. The country ranks among the highest for telephone and Internet access penetration.

Trade unions, employers' associations and collective agreements cover a large share of the employees in Sweden. The high coverage of collective agreements is achieved despite the absence of state mechanisms extending collective agreements to whole industries or sectors. Both the prominent role of collective bargaining and the way in which the high rate of coverage is achieved reflect the dominance of self-regulation (regulation by the labour market parties themselves) over state regulation in Swedish industrial relations. When the Swedish Ghent system was changed in 2007, resulting in considerably raised fees to unemployment funds, a substantial decline in union density and density of unemployment funds occurred.

In 2010, Sweden's income Gini coefficient was the third lowest among developed countries, at 0.25—slightly higher than Japan and Denmark—suggesting Sweden had low income inequality. However, Sweden's wealth Gini coefficient at 0.853 was the second highest in developed countries, and above European and North American averages, suggesting high wealth inequality. Even on a disposable income basis, the geographical distribution of Gini coefficient of income inequality varies within different regions and municipalities of Sweden. Danderyd, outside Stockholm, has Sweden's highest Gini coefficient of income inequality, at 0.55, while Hofors near Gävle has the lowest at 0.25. In and around Stockholm and Scania, two of the more densely populated regions of Sweden, the income Gini coefficient is between 0.35 and 0.55.

In terms of structure, the Swedish economy is characterised by a large, knowledge-intensive and export-oriented manufacturing sector; an increasing, but comparatively small, business service sector; and by international standards, a large public service sector. Large organisations, both in manufacturing and services, dominate the Swedish economy. High and medium-high technology manufacturing accounts for 9.9% of GDP.

The 20 largest (by turnover) registered Swedish companies in 2007 were Volvo, Ericsson, Vattenfall, Skanska, Sony Ericsson Mobile Communications AB, Svenska Cellulosa Aktiebolaget, Electrolux, Volvo Personvagnar, TeliaSonera, Sandvik, Scania, ICA, Hennes & Mauritz, IKEA, Nordea, Preem, Atlas Copco, Securitas, Nordstjernan and SKF. The vast majority of Sweden's industry is privately controlled, unlike many other industrialised Western countries, and, in accordance with a historical standard, publicly owned enterprises are of minor importance.

An estimated 4.5 million Swedish residents are employed, and around a third of the workforce completed tertiary education. In terms of GDP per-hour-worked, Sweden was the world's ninth highest in 2006 at US$31, compared to US$22 in Spain and US$35 in the United States. GDP per-hour-worked is growing 2.5% per year for the economy as a whole and the trade-terms-balanced productivity growth is 2%. According to the OECD, deregulation, globalisation, and technology sector growth have been key productivity drivers. Sweden is a world leader in privatised pensions and pension funding problems are relatively small compared to many other Western European countries. A pilot program to test the feasibility of a six-hour workday, without loss of pay, will commence in 2014, involving the participation of Gothenburg municipal staff. The Swedish government is seeking to reduce its costs through decreased sick leave hours and increased efficiency.

The typical worker receives 40% of his or her labour costs after the tax wedge. Total tax collected by Sweden as a percentage of its GDP peaked at 52.3% in 1990. The country faced a real estate and banking crisis in 1990–1991, and consequently passed tax reforms in 1991 to implement tax rate cuts and tax base broadening over time. Since 1990, taxes as a percentage of GDP collected by Sweden have been dropping, with total tax rates for the highest income earners dropping the most. In 2010 45.8% of the country's GDP was collected as taxes, the second highest among OECD countries, and nearly double the percentage in the US or South Korea. Tax income-financed employment represents a third of the Swedish workforce, a substantially higher proportion than in most other countries. Overall, GDP growth has been fast since reforms—especially those in manufacturing—were enacted in the early 1990s.

Sweden is the fourth-most competitive economy in the world, according to the World Economic Forum in its Global Competitiveness Report 2012–2013. Sweden is the top performing country in the 2014 Global Green Economy Index (GGEI). Sweden is ranked fourth in the IMD World Competitiveness Yearbook 2013. According to the book The Flight of the Creative Class by the US economist Professor Richard Florida of the University of Toronto, Sweden is ranked as having the best creativity in Europe for business and is predicted to become a talent magnet for the world's most purposeful workers. The book compiled an index to measure the kind of creativity it claims is most useful to business—talent, technology and tolerance.

Sweden maintains its own currency, the Swedish krona (SEK), a result of the Swedes having rejected the euro in a referendum. The Swedish Riksbank—founded in 1668 and thus the oldest central bank in the world—is currently focusing on price stability with an inflation target of 2%. According to the Economic Survey of Sweden 2007 by the OECD, the average inflation in Sweden has been one of the lowest among European countries since the mid-1990s, largely because of deregulation and quick utilisation of globalisation.

The largest trade flows are with Germany, the United States, Norway, the United Kingdom, Denmark and Finland.

Financial deregulation in the 1980s adversely affected the property market, leading to a bubble and eventually a crash in the early 1990s. Commercial property prices fell by up to two thirds, resulting in two Swedish banks having to be taken over by the government. In the following two decades the property sector strengthened. By 2014, legislators, economists and the IMF were again warning of a bubble with residential property prices soaring and the level of personal mortgage debt expanding. Household debt-to-income rose above 170% as the IMF was calling on legislators to consider zoning reform and other means of generating a greater supply of housing as demand was outstripping what was available, pushing prices higher. By August 2014, 40% of home borrowers had interest-only loans while those that didn't were repaying principal at a rate that would take 100 years to fully repay.

Energy

Sweden's energy market is largely privatised. The Nordic energy market is one of the first liberalised energy markets in Europe and it is traded in NASDAQ OMX Commodities Europe and Nord Pool Spot. In 2006, out of a total electricity production of 139 TWh, electricity from hydropower accounted for 61 TWh (44%), and nuclear power delivered 65 TWh (47%). At the same time, the use of biofuels, peat etc. produced 13 TWh (9%) of electricity, while wind power produced 1 TWh (1%). Sweden was a net importer of electricity by a margin of 6 TWh. Biomass is mainly used to produce heat for district heating and central heating and industry processes.

Sweden joined the International Energy Agency in 1974, after the 1973 oil crisis strengthened Sweden's commitment to decrease dependence on imported fossil fuels. To protect against unexpected oil supply shocks and in accordance with international commitments made through the IEA, Sweden maintains a strategic petroleum reserve of at least 90 days of net oil imports. As of February 2022, Sweden's oil reserves totalled 130 days’ worth of net imports. Sweden has moved to generate electricity mostly from hydropower and nuclear power. The use of nuclear power has been limited, however. Among other things, the accident of Three Mile Island Nuclear Generating Station (United States) prompted the Riksdag to ban new nuclear plants. In March 2005, an opinion poll showed that 83% supported maintaining or increasing nuclear power.

Sweden is considered a "global leader" in decarbonisation. Politicians have made announcements about oil phase-out in Sweden, decrease of nuclear power, and multibillion-dollar investments in renewable energy and energy efficiency. The country has for many years pursued a strategy of indirect taxation as an instrument of environmental policy, including energy taxes in general and carbon dioxide taxes in particular. Sweden was the first nation to implement carbon pricing, and its carbon prices remain the highest in the world as of 2020. This model has been shown to be particularly effective at decarbonizing the nation's economy. In 2014, Sweden was net exporter of electricity by a margin of 16 TWh; the production from wind power mills had increased to 11.5 TWh.

Transport

Motorways run through Sweden and over the Øresund Bridge to Denmark. New motorways are still under construction and a new motorway from Uppsala to Gävle was finished on 17 October 2007. Sweden had left-hand traffic ( in Swedish) from approximately 1736 and continued to do so well into the 20th century. Voters rejected right-hand traffic in 1955, but after the Riksdag passed legislation in 1963 changeover took place on 3 September 1967, known in Swedish as Dagen H.

The Stockholm metro is the only underground system in Sweden and serves the city of Stockholm via 100 stations. The rail transport market is privatised, but while there are many privately owned enterprises, the largest operators are still owned by the state. The counties have financing, ticket and marketing responsibility for local trains. For other trains the operators handle tickets and marketing themselves. Operators include SJ, Veolia Transport, Green Cargo, Tågkompaniet and Inlandsbanan. Most of the railways are owned and operated by Trafikverket.

Most tram networks were closed in 1967, as Sweden changed from left-side to right-side driving. But they survived in Norrköping, Stockholm and Gothenburg, with Gothenburg tram network being the largest. A new tram line opened in Lund on 13 December 2020.

Sweden hosts the two largest port companies in Scandinavia, Port of Göteborg AB (Gothenburg) and the transnational company Copenhagen Malmö Port AB. The most used airport for a large part of Southern Sweden is Kastrup or Copenhagen Airport which is located only 12 minutes by train from the closest Swedish railway station, Hyllie. Copenhagen Airport also is the largest international airport in Scandinavia and Finland.

Sweden also has a number of car ferry connections to several neighbouring countries. This includes a route from Umeå across the Gulf of Bothnia to Vaasa in Finland. There are several connections from the Stockholm area across the Sea of Åland to Mariehamn in Åland as well as Turku and Helsinki on the Finnish mainland and beyond to Estonia and St Petersburg in Russia. Ferry routes from the Stockholm area also connect with Ventspils and Riga in Latvia as well as Gdańsk in Poland across the Baltic Sea. The ferry ports of Karlskrona and Karlshamn in southeastern Sweden serve Gdynia, Poland, and Klaipeda, Lithuania. Ystad and Trelleborg near the southern tip of Sweden have ferry links with the Danish island of Bornholm and the German ports of Sassnitz, Rostock and Travemünde, respectively, and ferries run to Świnoujście, Poland, from both of them. Trelleborg is the busiest ferry port in Sweden in terms of weight transported by lorry. Its route to Sassnitz started as a steam-operated railway ferry in the 19th century, and today's ferry still carries trains to Berlin during the summer months. Another ferry route to Travemünde originates from Malmö. Despite the opening of the fixed link to Denmark, the Øresund Bridge, the busiest ferry route remains the short link across the narrowest section of the Øresund between Helsingborg and the Danish port of Helsingør, known as the HH Ferry route. There are over seventy departures a day each way; during peak times, a ferry departs every fifteen minutes. Ports higher up the Swedish west coast include Varberg, with a ferry connection across the Kattegat to Grenaa in Denmark, and Göteborg, serving Frederikshavn at the northern tip of Denmark and Kiel in Germany. Finally, there are ferries from Strömstad near the Norwegian border to destinations around the Oslofjord in Norway. There used to be ferry services to the United Kingdom from Göteborg to destinations such as Immingham, Harwich and Newcastle, but these have been discontinued.

Sweden has two domestic ferry lines with large vessels, both connecting Gotland with the mainland. The lines leave from Visby harbour on the island, and the ferries sail to either Oskarshamn or Nynäshamn. A smaller car ferry connects the island of Ven in Øresund with Landskrona.

Public policy

Sweden has one of the most highly developed welfare states in the world. According to a 2012 OECD report, the country had the second-highest public social spending as a percentage of its GDP after France (27.3% and 28.4%, respectively), and the third-highest total (public and private) social spending at 30.2% of its GDP, after France and Belgium (31.3% and 31.0%, respectively). Sweden spent 6.3% of its GDP, the ninth-highest among 34 OECD countries, to provide equal access to education. On health care, the country spent 10.0% of its total GDP, the 12th highest.

Historically, Sweden provided solid support for free trade (except agriculture) and mostly relatively strong and stable property rights (both private and public), though some economists have pointed out that Sweden promoted industries with tariffs and used publicly subsidised R&D during the country's early critical years of industrialisation. After World War II a succession of governments expanded the welfare state by raising the taxes. During this period Sweden's economic growth was also one of the highest in the industrial world. A series of successive social reforms transformed the country into one of the most equal and developed on earth. The consistent growth of the welfare state led to Swedes achieving unprecedented levels of social mobility and quality of life—to this day Sweden consistently ranks at the top of league tables for health, literacy and Human Development—far ahead of some wealthier countries (for example the United States).

However, from the 1970s and onwards Sweden's GDP growth fell behind other industrialised countries and the country's per capita ranking fell from fourth to 14th place in a few decades. From the mid-1990s until today Sweden's economic growth has once again accelerated and has been higher than in most other industrialised countries (including the US) during the last 15 years. A report from the United Nations Development Program predicted that Sweden's rating on the Human Development Index will fall from 0.949 in 2010 to 0.906 in 2030.

Sweden began slowing the expansion of the welfare state in the 1980s, and even trimming it back. Sweden has been relatively quick to adopt neoliberal policies, such as privatisation, financialisation and deregulation, compared to countries such as France. The current Swedish government is continuing the trend of moderate rollbacks of previous social reforms. Growth has been higher than in many other EU-15 countries. Also since the mid-1980s, Sweden has had the fastest growth in inequality of any developed nation, according to the OECD. This has largely been attributed to the reduction in state benefits and a shift toward the privatisation of public services. According to Barbro Sorman, an activist of the opposition Left Party, "The rich are getting richer, and the poor are getting poorer. Sweden is starting to look like the USA." Nevertheless, it remains far more egalitarian than most nations. Partly as a result of these privatisations and widening economic disparity, the Swedes in the 2014 elections put the Social Democrats back in power.

Sweden adopted free market agricultural policies in 1990. Since the 1930s, the agricultural sector had been subject to price controls. In June 1990, the Riksdag voted for a new agricultural policy marking a significant shift away from price controls. As a result, food prices fell somewhat. However, the liberalisations soon became moot because EU agricultural controls supervened.

Since the late 1960s, Sweden has had the highest tax quota (as percentage of GDP) in the industrialised world, although today the gap has narrowed and Denmark has surpassed Sweden as the most heavily taxed country among developed countries. Sweden has a two-step progressive tax scale with a municipal income tax of about 30% and an additional high-income state tax of 20–25% when a salary exceeds roughly 320,000 SEK per year. Payroll taxes amount to 32%. In addition, a national VAT of 25% is added to many things bought by private citizens, with the exception of food (12% VAT), transportation, and books (6% VAT). Certain items are subject to additional taxes, e.g. electricity, petrol/diesel and alcoholic beverages.

, total tax revenue was 47.8% of GDP, the second-highest tax burden among developed countries, down from 49.1% 2006. Sweden's inverted tax wedge – the amount going to the service worker's wallet – is approximately 15%, compared to 10% in Belgium, 30% in Ireland, and 50% in the United States. Public sector spending amounts to 53% of the GDP. State and municipal employees total around a third of the workforce, much more than in most Western countries. Only Denmark has a larger public sector (38% of Danish workforce). Spending on transfers is also high.

In 2015 and 2016, 69 per cent of the employed workers is organised in trade unions. Union density in 2016 was 62% among blue-collar-workers (most of them in the Swedish Trade Union Confederation, LO) and 75% among white-collar workers (most of them in the Swedish Confederation of Professional Employees, TCO, and the Swedish Confederation of Professional Associations, SACO). Sweden has state-supported union unemployment funds (Ghent system). Trade unions have the right to elect two representatives to the board in all Swedish companies with more than 25 employees. Sweden has a relatively high amount of sick leave per worker in OECD: the average worker loses 24 days due to sickness.

The unemployment rate was 7.2% in May 2017 while the employment rate was 67.4%, with the workforce consisting of 4,983,000 people while 387,000 are unemployed. Unemployment among youth (aged 24 or younger) in 2012 was 24.2%, making Sweden the OECD country with the highest ratio of youth unemployment versus unemployment in general.

Science and technology

In the 18th century, Sweden's scientific revolution took off. Previously, technical progress had mainly come from mainland Europe.

In 1739, the Royal Swedish Academy of Sciences was founded, with people such as Carl Linnaeus and Anders Celsius as early members. Many of the companies founded by early pioneers still remain major international brands. Gustaf Dalén founded AGA, and received the Nobel Prize for his sun valve. Alfred Nobel invented dynamite and instituted the Nobel Prizes. Lars Magnus Ericsson started the company bearing his name, Ericsson, still one of the largest telecom companies in the world. Jonas Wenström was an early pioneer in alternating current and is along with Serbian-American inventor Nikola Tesla credited as one of the inventors of the three-phase electrical system.

The traditional engineering industry is still a major source of Swedish inventions, but pharmaceuticals, electronics and other high-tech industries are gaining ground. Tetra Pak was an invention for storing liquid foods, invented by Erik Wallenberg. Losec, an ulcer medicine, was the world's best-selling drug in the 1990s and was developed by AstraZeneca. More recently Håkan Lans invented the Automatic Identification System, a worldwide standard for shipping and civil aviation navigation. A large portion of the Swedish economy is to this day based on the export of technical inventions, and many large multinational corporations from Sweden have their origins in the ingenuity of Swedish inventors.

Swedish inventors held 47,112 patents in the United States , according to the United States Patent and Trademark Office. As a nation, only ten other countries hold more patents than Sweden.

Combined, the public and the private sector in Sweden allocate over 3.5% of GDP to research & development (R&D) per year, making Sweden's investment in R&D as a percentage of GDP the second-highest in the world. For several decades the Swedish government has prioritised scientific and R&D activities. As a percentage of GDP, the Swedish government spends the most of any nation on research and development. Sweden tops other European countries in the number of published scientific works per capita.

In 2009, the decisions to construct Sweden's two largest scientific installations, the synchrotron radiation facility MAX IV Laboratory and the European Spallation Source (ESS), were taken. Both installations will be built in Lund. The European Spallation Source, costing some SEK 14 billion to construct, will begin initial operations in 2019 with construction completion scheduled for 2025. The ESS will give an approximately 30 times stronger neutron beam than any of today's existing neutron source installations. The MAX IV, costing some SEK 3 billion, was inaugurated on 21 June 2016. Both facilities have strong implications on material research. Sweden was ranked third in the Global Innovation Index in 2022.

Taxes

On average, 27% of taxpayers' money in Sweden goes to education and healthcare, whereas 5% goes to the police and military, and 42% to social security.

The typical worker receives 40% of his or her labour costs after the tax wedge. Total tax collected by Sweden as a percentage of its GDP peaked at 52.3% in 1990. The country faced a real estate and banking crisis in 1990–1991, and consequently passed tax reforms in 1991 to implement tax rate cuts and tax base broadening over time. Since 1990, taxes as a percentage of GDP collected by Sweden have been dropping, with total tax rates for the highest income earners dropping the most. In 2010, 45.8% of the country's GDP was collected as taxes, the second highest among OECD countries, and nearly double the percentage in the US or South Korea.

Pensions

Every Swedish resident receives a state pension. Swedish Pensions Agency is responsible for pensions. People who have worked in Sweden, but relocated to another country, can also receive the Swedish pension. There are several types of pensions in Sweden: occupational and private pensions, and national retirement. A person can receive a combination of the various types of pensions.

Demographics

The total resident population of Sweden was 10,377,781 in October 2020. The population exceeded 10 million for the first time on Friday 20 January 2017.

The average population density is just over 25 people per km2 (65 per square mile), with 1 437 persons per km2 in localities (continuous settlement with at least 200 inhabitants)., 87% of the population live in urban areas, which cover 1.5% of the entire land area. 63% of Swedes are in large urban areas. It is substantially higher in the south than in the north. The capital city Stockholm has a municipal population of about 950,000 (with 1.5 million in the urban area and 2.3 million in the metropolitan area). The second- and third-largest cities are Gothenburg and Malmö. Greater Gothenburg counts just over a million inhabitants and the same goes for the western part of Scania, along the Öresund. The Öresund Region, the Danish-Swedish cross-border region around the Öresund that Malmö is part of, has a population of 4 million. Outside of major cities, areas with notably higher population density include the agricultural part of Östergötland, the western coast, the area around Lake Mälaren and the agricultural area around Uppsala.

Norrland, which covers approximately 60% of the Swedish territory, has a very low population density (below 5 people per square kilometre). The mountains and most of the remote coastal areas are almost unpopulated. Low population density exists also in large parts of western Svealand, as well as southern and central Småland. An area known as Finnveden, which is located in the south-west of Småland, and mainly below the 57th parallel, can also be considered as almost empty of people.

Between 1820 and 1930, approximately 1.3 million Swedes, a third of the country's population at the time, emigrated to North America, and most of them to the United States. There are more than 4.4 million Swedish Americans according to a 2006 US Census Bureau estimate. In Canada, the community of Swedish ancestry is 330,000 strong.

There are no official statistics on ethnicity, but according to Statistics Sweden, 2,752,572 (26%) inhabitants of Sweden were of a foreign background in 2021, defined as being born abroad or born in Sweden with both foreign-born parents. Of these inhabitants, 2,090,503 persons were born abroad and 662,069 persons were born in Sweden to parents born abroad. In addition, 805,340 persons had one parent born abroad with the other parent born in Sweden.

Sweden has one of the oldest populations in the world, with the average age of 41.1 years.

Language

The official language of Sweden is Swedish, a North Germanic language, related and very similar to Danish and Norwegian, but differing in pronunciation and orthography. Norwegians have little difficulty understanding Swedish, and Danes can also understand it, with slightly more difficulty than Norwegians. The same goes for standard Swedish speakers, who find it far easier to understand Norwegian than Danish. The dialects spoken in Scania, the southernmost part of the country, are influenced by Danish because the region traditionally was a part of Denmark and is nowadays situated closely to it. Sweden Finns are Sweden's largest linguistic minority, comprising about 5% of Sweden's population, and Finnish is recognised as a minority language. Owing to a 21st-century influx of native speakers of Arabic, the use of Arabic is likely more widespread in the country than that of Finnish. However, no official statistics are kept on language use.

Along with Finnish, four other minority languages are also recognised: Meänkieli, Sami, Romani, and Yiddish. Swedish became Sweden's official language on 1 July 2009, when a new language law was implemented. The issue of whether Swedish should be declared the official language had been raised in the past, and the Riksdag voted on the matter in 2005, but the proposal narrowly failed.

In varying degrees, a majority of Swedes, especially those born after World War II, understand and speak English, owing to trade links, the popularity of overseas travel, a strong Anglo-American influence and the tradition of subtitling rather than dubbing foreign television shows and films, and the relative similarity of the two languages which makes learning English easier. In a 2005 survey by Eurobarometer, 89% of Swedes reported the ability to speak English.

English became a compulsory subject for secondary school students studying natural sciences as early as 1849, and has been a compulsory subject for all Swedish students since the late 1940s. Depending on the local school authorities, English is currently a compulsory subject between first grade and ninth grade, with all students continuing in secondary school studying English for at least another year. Most students also study one and sometimes two additional languages. Some Danish and Norwegian is also taught as part of Swedish courses for native speakers. Because of the extensive mutual intelligibility between the three continental Scandinavian languages, Swedish speakers often use their native language when visiting or living in Norway or Denmark.

Religion

Before the 11th century, Swedes adhered to Norse paganism, worshiping Æsir gods, with its centre at the Temple in Uppsala. With Christianisation in the 11th century, the laws of the country changed, forbidding worship of other deities until the late 19th century. After the Protestant Reformation in the 1530s, a change led by Martin Luther's Swedish associate Olaus Petri, the authority of the Roman Catholic Church was abolished and Lutheranism became widespread. Adoption of Lutheranism was completed by the Uppsala Synod of 1593, and it became the official religion. During the era following the Reformation, usually known as the period of Lutheran orthodoxy, small groups of non-Lutherans, especially Calvinist Dutchmen, the Moravian Church and French Huguenots played a significant role in trade and industry, and were quietly tolerated as long as they kept a low religious profile. The Sami originally had their own shamanistic religion, but they were converted to Lutheranism by Swedish missionaries in the 17th and 18th centuries.

With religious liberalisations in the late 18th century believers of other faiths, including Judaism and Roman Catholicism, were allowed to live and work freely in the country. However, until 1860 it remained illegal for Lutherans to convert to another religion. The 19th century saw the arrival of various evangelical free churches, and, towards the end of the century, secularism, leading many to distance themselves from church rituals. Leaving the Church of Sweden became legal with the so-called Dissenter Act of 1860, but only under the provision of entering another Christian denomination. The right to stand outside any religious denomination was formally established in the law on freedom of religion in 1951.

In 2000, the Church of Sweden was disestablished. Sweden was the second Nordic country to disestablish its state church (after Finland did so in the Church Act of 1869).

At the end of 2018, 57.7% of Swedes belonged to the Church of Sweden; this number had been decreasing by about 1.5 percentage points a year for the previous seven years and one percentage point a year on average for the previous two decades. Approximately 2% of the church's members regularly attend Sunday services. The reason for the large number of inactive members is partly that, until 1996, children automatically became members at birth if at least one of the parents was a member. Since 1996, only children and adults who are christened become members. Some 275,000 Swedes are today members of various Evangelical Protestant free churches (where congregation attendance is much higher), and due to recent immigration, there are now some 100,000 Eastern Orthodox Christians and 92,000 Roman Catholics living in Sweden.

The first Muslim congregation was established in 1949, when a small contingent of Tatars migrated from Finland. Islam's presence in Sweden remained marginal until the 1960s, when Sweden started to receive migrants from the Balkans and Turkey. Further immigration from North Africa and the Middle East have brought the estimated Muslim population to 600,000. However, only about 110,000 were members of a congregation around 2010.

According to the Eurobarometer Poll 2010,
 18% of Swedish citizens responded that "they believe there is a god".
 45% answered that "they believe there is some sort of spirit or life force".
 34% answered that "they do not believe there is any sort of spirit, god, or life force".

According to a Demoskop study in 2015, the beliefs of the Swedish showed that
 21% believed in a god (down from 35 percent in 2008).
 16% believed in ghosts.
 14% believed in creationism or intelligent design.

Sociology professor Phil Zuckerman claims that Swedes, despite a lack of belief in God, commonly question the term atheist, preferring to call themselves Christians while being content with remaining in the Church of Sweden. Religion continues to play a role in Swedish cultural identity. This is evidenced by the fact that the majority of Swedish adults continue to remain members of the Lutheran Church despite having to pay a church tax; moreover, rates of baptism remain high and church weddings are increasing in Sweden.

Health

Healthcare in Sweden is mainly tax-funded, universal for all citizens, and decentralised, although private health care also exists. The health care system in Sweden is financed primarily through taxes levied by regional councils and municipalities. A total of 21 councils are in charge of primary and hospital care within the country.

Private healthcare is a rarity in Sweden, and even those private institutions work under the mandated city councils. The city councils regulates the rules and the establishment of potential private practices. While care for the elderly or those who need psychiatric help is conducted privately in many other countries, in Sweden, publicly funded local authorities are in charge of this type of care.

Healthcare in Sweden is similar in quality to other developed nations. Sweden ranks in the top five countries with respect to low infant mortality. It also ranks high in life expectancy and in safe drinking water. In 2018, health and medical care represented around 11% of GDP.

Education 

Children aged 1–5 years old are guaranteed a place in a public kindergarten ( or, colloquially). Between the ages of 6 and 16, children attend compulsory comprehensive school. In the Programme for International Student Assessment (PISA), Swedish 15-year-old pupils score close to the OECD average. After completing the ninth grade, about 90% of the students continue with a three-year upper secondary school (gymnasium), which can lead to both a job qualification or entrance eligibility to university. The school system is largely financed by taxes.

The Swedish government treats public and independent schools equally by introducing education vouchers in 1992 as one of the first countries in the world after the Netherlands. Anyone can establish a for-profit school and the municipality must pay new schools the same amount as municipal schools get. School lunch is free for all students in Sweden, and providing breakfast is also encouraged.

There are a number of different universities and colleges in Sweden, the oldest and largest of which are situated in Uppsala, Lund, Gothenburg and Stockholm. In 2000, 32% of Swedish people held a tertiary degree, making the country fifth in the OECD in that category. Along with several other European countries, the government also subsidises tuition of international students pursuing a degree at Swedish institutions, although a recent bill passed in the Riksdag will limit this subsidy to students from EEA countries and Switzerland.

The large influx of immigrants to Swedish schools has been cited as a significant part of the reason why Sweden has dropped more than any other European country in the international PISA rankings.

Immigration

In recent centuries the country has been transformed from a nation of net emigration, ending after World War I, to a nation of net immigration, from World War II onwards. In recent years the country has received a massive influx of refugees and immigrants mainly due to the Syrian war which broke out in 2015. Sweden received more refugees per capita than anywhere else in Europe. In 2015 alone a record-breaking 163,000 people applied for asylum to a country of barely 10 million people.

The economic, social, and political aspects of immigration have caused controversy regarding ethnicity, economic benefits, jobs for non-immigrants, settlement patterns, effects on upward social mobility, crime, and voting behaviour.

There are no exact numbers on the ethnic background of migrants and their descendants in Sweden because the Swedish government does not base any statistics on ethnicity. This is, however, not to be confused with the migrants' national backgrounds, which are recorded.

Immigrants in Sweden are mostly concentrated in the urban areas of Svealand and Götaland. Since the early 1970s, immigration to Sweden has been mostly due to refugee migration and family reunification from countries in Asia (particularly Western Asia) and Latin America. In 2019, Sweden granted 21,958 people asylum, up from 21,502 in 2018.

In 2021 one in five people (2,090,503) in Sweden were born abroad. The ten largest groups of foreign-born persons in the Swedish civil registry in 2021 were from:
  (196,077)
 (146,769)
  (136,607)
  (95,076)
  (83,122)
  (70,087)
  (62,803)
  Former Yugoslavia (62,444)
  (60,194)
  (54,004)

According to an official investigation by The Swedish Pensions Agency on order from the government, the immigration to Sweden will double the state's expenses for pensions to the population.

Culture

Sweden has many authors of worldwide recognition including August Strindberg, Astrid Lindgren, and Nobel Prize winners Selma Lagerlöf and Harry Martinson. In total seven Nobel Prizes in Literature have been awarded to Swedes. The nation's most well-known artists are painters such as Carl Larsson and Anders Zorn, and the sculptors Tobias Sergel and Carl Milles.

Swedish 20th-century culture is noted by pioneering works in the early days of cinema, with Mauritz Stiller and Victor Sjöström. In the 1920s–1980s, the filmmaker Ingmar Bergman and actors Greta Garbo and Ingrid Bergman became internationally noted people within cinema. More recently, the films of Lukas Moodysson, Lasse Hallström, and Ruben Östlund have received international recognition.

Throughout the 1960s and 1970s, Sweden was seen as an international leader in what is now referred to as the "sexual revolution", with gender equality having particularly been promoted. The early Swedish film I Am Curious (Yellow) (1967) reflected a liberal view of sexuality, including scenes of love making that caught international attention, and introduced the concept of the "Swedish sin" that had been introduced earlier in the US with Ingmar Bergman's Summer with Monika.

The image of "hot love and cold people" emerged. Sexual liberalism was seen as part of modernisation process that by breaking down traditional borders would lead to the emancipation of natural forces and desires.

Sweden has also become very liberal towards homosexuality, as is reflected in the popular acceptance of films such as Show Me Love, which is about two young lesbians in the small Swedish town of Åmål. Since 1 May 2009, Sweden repealed its "registered partnership" laws and fully replaced them with gender-neutral marriage. Sweden also offers domestic partnerships for both same-sex and opposite-sex couples. Cohabitation by couples of all ages, including teenagers as well as elderly couples, is widespread. As of 2009, Sweden is experiencing a baby boom.

Music

Historical re-creations of Norse music have been attempted based on instruments found in Viking sites. The instruments used were the lur (a sort of trumpet), simple string instruments, wooden flutes and drums. Sweden has a significant folk-music scene. The joik, a type of Sami music, is a chant that is part of the traditional Sami animistic spirituality. Notable composers include Carl Michael Bellman and Franz Berwald.

Sweden also has a prominent choral music tradition. Out of a population of 9.5 million, it is estimated that five to six hundred thousand people sing in choirs.

In 2007, with over 800 million dollars in revenue, Sweden was the third-largest music exporter in the world and surpassed only by the US and the UK. According to one source 2013, Sweden produces the most chart hits per capita in the world, followed by the UK and the USA.
Sweden has a rather lively jazz scene. During the last sixty years or so it has attained a remarkably high artistic standard, stimulated by domestic as well as external influences and experiences. The Centre for Swedish Folk Music and Jazz Research has published an overview of jazz in Sweden by Lars Westin.

Architecture

Before the 13th century almost all buildings were made of timber, but a shift began towards stone. Early Swedish stone buildings are the Romanesque churches on the countryside. As so happens, many of them were built in Scania and are in effect Danish churches. This would include the Lund Cathedral from the 11th century and the somewhat younger church in Dalby, but also many early Gothic churches built through influences of the Hanseatic League, such as in Ystad, Malmö and Helsingborg.

Cathedrals in other parts of Sweden were also built as seats of Sweden's bishops. The Skara Cathedral is of bricks from the 14th century, and the Uppsala Cathedral in the 15th. In 1230 the foundations of the Linköping Cathedral were made, the material was there limestone, but the building took some 250 years to finish.

Among older structures are also some significant fortresses and other historical buildings such as at Borgholm Castle, Halltorps Manor and Eketorp fortress on the island Öland, the Nyköping fortress and the Visby city wall.

Around 1520 Sweden was out of the Middle Ages and united under King Gustav Vasa, who immediately initiated grand mansions, castles and fortresses to be built. Some of the more magnificent include Kalmar Castle, Gripsholm Castle and the one at Vadstena.

In the next two centuries, Sweden was designated by Baroque architecture and later the rococo. Notable projects from that time include the city Karlskrona, which has now also been declared a World Heritage Site and the Drottningholm Palace.

The style came to dominate in the following decades. Some notable projects of this kind were the Million Programme, offering affordable living in large apartment complexes.

The Ericsson Globe, located in Stockholm, is the largest hemispherical building on Earth. Its dome has a diameter of 110 metres (360 feet) and took two and a half years to build.

Media

Swedes are among the greatest consumers of newspapers in the world, and nearly every town is served by a local paper. The country's main quality morning papers are Dagens Nyheter (liberal), Göteborgs-Posten (liberal), Svenska Dagbladet (liberal conservative) and Sydsvenska Dagbladet (liberal). The two largest evening tabloids are Aftonbladet (social democratic) and Expressen (liberal). The ad-financed, free international morning paper, Metro International, was founded in Stockholm, Sweden. The country's news is reported in English by, among others, The Local (liberal).

The public broadcasting companies held a monopoly on radio and television for a long time in Sweden. Licence-funded radio broadcasts started in 1925. A second radio network was started in 1954, and a third opened 1962, in response to pirate radio stations. Non-profit community radio was allowed in 1979 and in 1993 commercial local radio started.

The licence-funded television service was officially launched in 1956. A second channel, TV2, was launched in 1969. These two channels (operated by Sveriges Television since the late 1970s) held a monopoly until the 1980s when cable and satellite television became available. The first Swedish-language satellite service was TV3 which started broadcasting from London in 1987. It was followed by Kanal 5 in 1989 (then known as Nordic Channel) and TV4 in 1990.

In 1991 the government announced it would begin taking applications from private television companies wishing to broadcast on the terrestrial network. TV4, which had previously been broadcasting via satellite, was granted a permit and began its terrestrial broadcasts in 1992, becoming the first private channel to broadcast television content from within the country.

Around half the population are connected to cable television. Digital terrestrial television in Sweden started in 1999 and the last analogue terrestrial broadcasts were terminated in 2007.

Literature

The first literary text from Sweden is the Rök runestone, carved during the Viking Age c. 800 AD. With the conversion of the land to Christianity around 1100 AD, Sweden entered the Middle Ages, during which monastic writers preferred to use Latin. Therefore, there are only a few texts in the Old Swedish from that period. Swedish literature only began to flourish when the language was standardised during the 16th century. This standardisation was largely due to the full translation of the Bible into Swedish in 1541. This translation is the so-called Gustav Vasa Bible.

With improved education and the freedom brought by secularisation, the 17th century saw several notable authors develop the Swedish language further. Some key figures include Georg Stiernhielm (17th century), who was the first to write classical poetry in Swedish; Johan Henric Kellgren (18th century), the first to write fluent Swedish prose; Carl Michael Bellman (late 18th century), the first writer of burlesque ballads; and August Strindberg (late 19th century), a socio-realistic writer and playwright who won worldwide fame. The early 20th century continued to produce notable authors, such as Selma Lagerlöf, (Nobel laureate 1909), Verner von Heidenstam (Nobel laureate 1916) and Pär Lagerkvist (Nobel laureate 1951).

In recent decades, a handful of Swedish writers have established themselves internationally, including the detective novelist Henning Mankell and the writer of spy fiction Jan Guillou. The Swedish writer to have made the most lasting impression on world literature is the children's book writer Astrid Lindgren, and her books about Pippi Longstocking, Emil, and others. In 2008, the second best-selling fiction author in the world was Stieg Larsson, whose Millennium series of crime novels is being published posthumously to critical acclaim. Larsson drew heavily on the work of Lindgren by basing his central character, Lisbeth Salander, on Longstocking.

Holidays

Apart from traditional Protestant Christian holidays, Sweden also celebrates some unique holidays, some of a pre-Christian tradition. They include Midsummer celebrating the summer solstice; Walpurgis Night on 30 April lighting bonfires; and Labour Day or May Day on 1 May is dedicated to socialist demonstrations. The day of giver-of-light Saint Lucia, 13 December, is widely acknowledged in elaborate celebrations which betoken its Italian origin and commence the month-long Christmas season.

6 June is the National Day of Sweden and has since 2005 been a public holiday. Furthermore, there are official flag flying day observances and a Namesdays in Sweden calendar. In August many Swedes have  (crayfish dinner parties). Martin of Tours Eve is celebrated in Scania in November with  parties, where roast goose and svartsoppa ('black soup', made of goose stock, fruit, spices, spirits and goose blood) are served. The Sami, one of Sweden's indigenous minorities, have their holiday on 6 February and Scania celebrate their Scanian Flag day on the third Sunday in July.

Cuisine

Swedish cuisine, like that of the other Nordic countries (Denmark, Norway and Finland), was traditionally simple. Fish (particularly herring), meat, potatoes and dairy products played prominent roles. Spices were sparse. Preparations include Swedish meatballs, traditionally served with gravy, boiled potatoes and lingonberry jam; pancakes; pyttipanna, a spiced fried hash of meat and potatoes originally meant to use up any leftovers of meat; lutfisk; and the smörgåsbord, or lavish buffet. Akvavit is a popular alcoholic distilled beverage, and the drinking of snaps is of cultural importance. The traditional flat and dry crisp bread has developed into several contemporary variants. Regionally important foods are the surströmming (a fermented fish) in northern Sweden and eel in southern Sweden.

Swedish traditional dishes, some of which are many hundreds of years old, are still an important part of Swedish everyday meals, in spite of the fact that modern-day Swedish cuisine adopts many international dishes.

In August, at the traditional feast known as crayfish party, kräftskiva, Swedes eat large amounts of crayfish boiled with dill.

Cinema

Swedes have been fairly prominent in the film area through the years. A number of Swedish people have found success in Hollywood, including Ingrid Bergman, Greta Garbo and Max von Sydow. Amongst several directors who have made internationally successful films can be mentioned Ingmar Bergman, Lukas Moodysson and Lasse Hallström.

Fashion
Interest in fashion is big in Sweden and the country headquarters famous brands like Hennes & Mauritz (operating as H&M), J. Lindeberg (operating as JL), Acne, Lindex, Odd Molly, Cheap Monday, Gant, WESC, Filippa K, and Nakkna within its borders. These companies, however, are composed largely of buyers who import fashionable goods from throughout Europe and America, continuing the trend of Swedish business toward multinational economic dependency like many of its neighbours.

Sports

Sport activities are a national movement with half of the population actively participating in organised sporting activities. The two main spectator sports are football and ice hockey. Second to football, horse sports (of which most of the participants are women) have the highest number of practitioners. Thereafter, golf, orienteering, gymnastics, track and field, and the team sports of ice hockey, handball, floorball, basketball and bandy are the most popular in terms of practitioners.
The team has won the World Championships nine times, placing them third in the all-time medal count.  also won Olympic gold medals in 1994 and 2006. In 2006,  became the first national hockey team to win both the Olympic and world championships in the same year. The Swedish national men's football team has seen some success at the World Cup in the past, finishing second when they hosted the tournament in 1958, and third twice, in 1950 and 1994.

Sweden hosted the 1912 Summer Olympics, Equestrian at the 1956 Summer Olympics and the FIFA World Cup in 1958. Other big sports events include the UEFA Euro 1992, 1995 FIFA Women's World Cup, 1995 World Championships in Athletics, UEFA Women's Euro 2013, and several championships of ice hockey, curling, athletics, skiing, bandy, figure skating and swimming.

In 2016, the Swedish Poker Federation (Svepof) joined The International Federation of Poker (IFP).

See also

List of Sweden-related topics
 Outline of Sweden
 329 Svea

Notes

References

Further reading

 Bagge, Sverre (2005). "The Scandinavian Kingdoms". In The New Cambridge Medieval History. Eds. Rosamond McKitterick et al. Cambridge University Press, 2005. .
 
 Sweden. The World Factbook. Central Intelligence Agency.
 
 Durant, Colin (2003). Choral Conducting: philosophy and practice, Routledge, pp. 46–47. .
 Einhorn, Eric and John Logue (1989). Modern Welfare States: Politics and Policies in Social Democratic Scandinavia. Praeger Publishers, 1989. .
 
 Koblik, Steven (1975). Sweden's Development from Poverty to Affluence 1750–1970. University of Minnesota Press. .
 
 Magocsi, Paul Robert (1998). Encyclopedia of Canada's Peoples. University of Minnesota Press, 1998. .
 Ministry of Foreign Affairs, Sweden Agenda 21 – Natural Resource Aspects – Sweden. 5th Session of the United Nations Commission on Sustainable Development, April 1997.
 Nordstrom, Byron J. (2000). Scandinavia since 1500. University of Minnesota Press, 2000. .
 
 
 Ståhl, Solveig. (1999). "English spoken – fast ibland hellre än bra". LUM, Lunds universitet meddelar, 7:1999, 3 September 1999. In Swedish.
 
 
 
 
 Sweden: Social and economic conditions (2007). In Encyclopædia Britannica. Encyclopædia Britannica Online.
 
 Uddhammar, Emil (1993). Partierna och den stora staten: en analys av statsteorier och svensk politik under 1900-talet. Stockholm, City University Press.
 United States Department of State – Sweden
 Zuckerman, Phil (2007), Atheism: Contemporary Rates and Patterns PDF i Cambridge Companion to Atheism. Cambridge: Cambridge University Press.

External links

 Sweden. The World Factbook. Central Intelligence Agency.
 Sweden entry at Britannica.com
 
 
 
 Sweden from UCB Libraries GovPubs
 
 Sweden profile from the BBC News
 
 
 Key Development Forecasts for Sweden from International Futures
 Study in Sweden – official guide to studying in Sweden
 Wayback Machine Technological Waves and Economic Growth in Sweden 1850–2005
 Sweden – Economic Growth and Structural Change, 1800–2000 — EH.Net Encyclopedia
 vifanord – a digital library that provides scientific information on the Nordic and Baltic countries as well as the Baltic region as a whole

Public sector
 Sweden.se — Sweden's official portal
 The Swedish Parliament – official website
 The Government of Sweden – official website
 The Royal Court  – official website of the Swedish Monarchy

News media
 Radio Sweden – public service
 Sveriges Television  – public service
 Dagens Nyheter 
 Svenska Dagbladet 
 The Local – Sweden's news in English – independent English language news site

Trade
 World Bank Summary Trade Statistics Sweden

Travel
 VisitSweden.com – official travel and tourism website for Sweden

 
Northwestern European countries
Members of the Nordic Council
Member states of the European Union
Member states of the Union for the Mediterranean
Member states of the United Nations
Kingdom of Sweden
Scandinavian countries
Countries in Europe
States and territories established in the 12th century
Christian states
Swedish-speaking countries and territories
OECD members